31G Records, or Three One G, is a San Diego, California-based independent record label, started by musician Justin Pearson in 1994 and focusing on punk and experimental music. The label has released a number of albums and compilations in what has been described as "freak punk" and "spaz-rock." Musicians on the label frequently collaborate, creating supergroups such as Holy Molar, Some Girls, and Head Wound City. Three One G's roster has featured many noise rock bands.

History
31G Records was founded by Justin Pearson in San Diego, California in 1994. The name comes from the chorus of a Joy Division song "Warsaw", a song covered by Pearson's then-band, Swing Kids. The reference for '3-1-G' in the original song was to Rudolf Hess's prisoner number. The first album released on the new label was the 1994 single "And / Fall On Proverb" by metalcore band Unbroken. The second release was a reissue of the new debut album from hardcore punk and noise rock band Swing Kids, a band consisting of both the Unbroken guitarist Eric Allen and Pearson on vocals.

The following few releases also involved the same community of musicians, with a split between Swing Kids and Spanakorzo coming out in 1995, and the second released recording by Pearson's new band The Locust coming out as a split EP with Jenny Piccolo in 1996.

In 1998 Allysia Edwards joined with Pearson as a partner at the label, and their annual output began to increase. By January 2011, the label had put out approximately 60 releases total. Staff as of 2011 include Sal Gallego of Some Girls, Marcus D’Camp, Brandon McMinn,  Mike McGuire, Becky DiGiglio, and Pearson.

According to Pearson, the label's best selling releases have been Discography by Swing Kids, as well as March on Electric Children by The Blood Brothers.

Three One G has released a compilation of Queen covers by their artists called Dynamite With a Laserbeam: Queen as Heard Through the Meat Grinder of Three One G, as well as a similar tribute to The Birthday Party titled Release The Bats. There has also been a DVD documentary, This is Circumstantial Evidence, made about Three One G. In 2020 the label released a tribute album to The Cramps called Really Bad Music For Really Bad People: The Cramps As Heard Through The Meat Grinder Of Three One G and featured artists such as METZ, Chelsea Wolfe, and Mike Patton.

Collaborations
Reviewers have described the Three One G community of musicians under the umbrella term "freak punk" or "spaz-rock," saying "the intense, the slightly frightening, and the brutal all find a place for themselves and their music in Three One G Records."

Most of the label's bands have shared members or interact within the same musical community, and according to Pearson,

According to SSG Music, "It seems that members of San Diego label Three One G decide to form new supergroups at least once a year." Three One G bands Holy Molar, Ground Unicorn Horn, and Head Wound City were all formed with earlier musicians on the label. The label's supergroup Retox included Gabe Serbian and Pearson of The Locust, and many of the bands such as The Crimson Curse and Cattle Decapitation are connected to The Locust as well.

Roster

 Adam Gnade
 ADULT.
 All Leather
 Antioch Arrow
 Arab on Radar
 Asterisk*
 Bastard Noise
 Black Cat #13
 Black Dice
 The Blood Brothers
 Camera Obscura
 Cattle Decapitation
 The Chinese Stars
 The Crimson Curse
 Das Oath
 Dead Cross
 Deaf Club
 Death Eyes
 Doomsday Student
 Downcast
 End Of The Line
 Ex Models
 Fast Forward
 Festival Of Dead Deer
 Gabe Serbian
 Geromino
 Get Hustle
 Ground Unicorn Horn
 Haunted Horses
 Head Wound City
 Holy Molar
 Hot Nerds
 Ill Saint M
 Into Violence
 INUS
 Invisibl Skratch Piklz
 Jaks
 Jenny Piccolo
 Kill the Capulets
 Kool Keith 
 Leg Lifters
 Love Life
 Luke Henshaw
METZ
 Microwaves
 More Pain
 Moving Units
 Narrows
 Netherlands
 Orthrelm
 Panicker
 Paper Mice
 Planet B
 Qui
 Quintron
 Rats Eyes
 Retox
 Run For Your F_cking Life
 Satanic Planet
 Secret Fun Club
 Silent
 Some Girls
 Sonido de la Frontera
 Spanakorzo
 Ssion
 Struggle
 Swing Kids
 T-Cells
 The Plot To Blow Up The Eiffel Tower
 The Locust
 Unbroken
 Under Attack
 WARSAWWASRAW
 Wet Lungs
 Zealot RIP
 Zeus!
 Zs

References

External links
 Official site
 Three One G on MySpace
 Three One G on Facebook
 Three One G on Discogs
 Three One G on Last.fm

American record labels
Record labels established in 1994